Choccolocco is an unincorporated community and census-designated place in Calhoun County, Alabama, United States. As of the 2010 census, its population was 2,804. It was founded in 1832.

The name Choccolocco is an anglicization of the Creek words "chahko lago" ("big shoals") or "choko rakko" ("big house"); sources vary.

The community gained brief notoriety in 2001 when The Daily Show aired a piece on the "Choccolocco Monster", a part of local folklore concerning sightings of a mysterious creature in the area in the late 1960s. An October 2001 article in the Anniston Star newspaper revealed that the creature was, in fact, local resident Neal Williamson. As a teenager, Williamson would don his costume (consisting of a cow skull and a sheet) and gain the attention of passing cars by jumping out of the woods onto the roadside, often startling motorists.

Demographics

Choccolocco first appeared on the 1890 U.S. Census as a town, but did not appear again until 2010 when it was made a census-designated place (CDP).

See also
 Choccolocco Creek

References 

Census-designated places in Calhoun County, Alabama
Unincorporated communities in Alabama
Populated places established in 1832
Census-designated places in Alabama
Unincorporated communities in Calhoun County, Alabama
1832 establishments in Alabama
Alabama placenames of Native American origin